Sonnenstein can refer to:

 Sonnenstein, Austria, a mountain in Austria.
 Sonnenstein Castle, a castle in Saxony, Germany.
 Sonnenstein Euthanasia Centre, a Nazi killing facility at Sonnenstein Castle
 Sonnenstein (Ohm Hills), a hill in Thuringia, Germany.  
 Sonnenstein, Thuringia, a municipality in Thuringia, Germany.